State Route 22 (SR 22) is a  state highway that travels southwest-to-northeast in an eastern arc through portions of Muscogee, Talbot, Taylor, Upson, Crawford, Bibb, Jones, Baldwin, Hancock, Taliaferro, Oglethorpe, and Madison counties in the western and west-central parts of the U.S. state of Georgia. The highway connects the Alabama state line in Columbus, across the state line from Phenix City, Alabama, to Comer, via Macon and Milledgeville.

SR 22 originally traveled only from Columbus to Macon, and was incrementally extended to Comer in stages. It was rerouted many times in Columbus and formerly had a more northern path in the Macon area.

The part of the highway from the Alabama state line east to Geneva is part of the Fall Line Freeway, a long-distance highway that is planned to extend from the Alabama state line to Augusta. Also, this section could be included in the proposed eastern extension of Interstate 14 (I-14).

Route description

Columbus to Macon
SR 22 and SR 540 (Fall Line Freeway) begin at the Alabama state line concurrent with US 80. West of the state line, US 80 continues over the Chattahoochee River into Phenix City as Phenix City Bypass (internally designated as Alabama State Route 8). Eastward, US 80/SR 22/SR 540 travel on the J.R. Allen Parkway, a limited-access bypass of Columbus in Muscogee County. Almost immediately, they have an interchange with the northern terminus of SR 22 Conn. (2nd Avenue). Then they have an interchange with SR 219 (River Road). After that is Bradley Park Drive. Then, they have a full cloverleaf interchange with Interstate 185 (I-185). The same exit lanes for I-185 are also used for US 27/SR 1 (Veterans Parkway) and Moon Road. Then is a partial interchange with Schomburg Road and Blackmon Road. The highways curve to the southeast and have an interchange with US 27 Alt./SR 85 (Manchester Expressway). Here, the freeway ends and the two highways continue to the east and meet the eastern terminus of SR 22 Spur (Macon Road). US 80/SR 22 begin paralleling the northern border of Fort Benning and travel through the town of Upatoi. They travel south of Cox Lake and cross over the Tar River north of Montarella Lake, before crossing over Baker Creek into Talbot County. They travel to the north of Box Springs. The highways meet the northern terminus of SR 355. Just before entering Geneva, SR 41 joins the concurrency. In Geneva, they meet the western terminus of SR 96, where SR 540 departs the concurrency on SR 96, and turn to the north. In Talbotton, they intersect SR 90/SR 208 (Clark Street). At this intersection, SR 90 meets its western terminus, and SR 208 joins the concurrency very briefly and departs at Monroe Street. A few blocks later, SR 41 also leaves the concurrency to the north on Washington Avenue, while US 80/SR 22 curve to the east. After traveling through rural areas of the county, they travel along the Talbot–Taylor county line before entering Taylor County proper. They intersect US 19/SR 3, which join the concurrency. The four highways cross over the Flint River into Upson County. Not long afterward, US 80/SR 22 split off to resume their eastern routing and enter Crawford County. In Roberta, they intersect US 341/SR 7/SR 42 (Dugger Avenue). At this intersection, SR 42 joins the concurrency. The three highways pass the Crawford County Public Library and Crawford County Middle School. In nearby Knoxville, SR 42 departs the concurrency, while US 80/SR 22 begin a curve to the northeast. They gradually curve to the east-northeast before crossing over Echoconnee Creek into Bibb County. Just before entering Lizella, they curve to the southeast and begin to curve back to the northeast and enter Macon.

Macon metropolitan area
They pass by Macon State College before an interchange with I-475. US 80/SR 22 curve to the east and travel between Macon Mall and Central Georgia Technical College. Next to Westgate Mall, they intersect US 41/SR 247 (Pio Nono Avenue). Just under  later, they have an interchange with I-75/SR 540. Then, they pass Saints Rest Cemetery and Memorial Park, before they intersect US 41 Bus./US 129/SR 11/SR 49 (Broadway). At this intersection, all six highways travel concurrently to the north and curve to the northeast. At Walnut Street, US 41 Bus./SR 22/SR 49 split off to the northwest. At 2nd Street, SR 22 departs to the northeast. There is an interchange with US 129/SR 11/SR 87 that is only accessible from the westbound lanes. Immediately, the road crosses over the Ocmulgee River and passes over I-16/SR 540 (Jim Gillis Historic Savannah Parkway), which has a partial interchange with SR 22, but there is no access to I-16/SR 540 from either direction of SR 22 or to SR 22 from I-16/SR 540 east. Just west of Coliseum Medical Center is an intersection with US 23/US 129 Alt./SR 19 (Emery Highway). At the intersection with US 129/SR 11/SR 49, US 129 Alt. meets its northern terminus, and SR 22 joins that concurrency to the north-northeast. Less than  later, SR 49 (Shurling Drive) splits off to the east.

Jones County to Comer
US 129/SR 11/SR 22 cross over Walnut Creek and then enter Jones County. Just before intersecting SR 18, the concurrency passes by Brasswells Lake, Newberry Lake, and Anderson Lake. On the southwestern edge of the city limits of Gray, SR 18 joins the concurrency. The four highways enter the main part of the town. At Bill Conn Parkway, SR 18 splits off to the southeast. At Atlanta Road, SR 11 departs the concurrency to the north. One block later, they intersect SR 44. Here, US 129 heads to the north, concurrent with SR 44, while SR 22 continues to the northeast. Just outside town, it passes Lake Jonesco Golf Course. After traveling through Haddock, the route enters Baldwin County. After entering Milledgeville, it passes the Walter B. Williams, Jr. Park. Immediately afterward, it meets the southern terminus of SR 212. Then, it intersects US 441/SR 29 (Robertson Mill Road). SR 22 passes by Youth Development Center Lake and Oconee Regional Medical Center. It curves to the south-southeast and then to the east-northeast and intersects US 441 Bus./SR 24/SR 29 Bus. (North Columbia Street). The four highways travel concurrently to the east-northeast on West Montgomery Street. One block later, US 441 Bus. departs to the south-southeast on North Clark Street, concurrent with SR 29 Bus. SR 22/SR 24 parallel the northern edge of Georgia College & State University. At North Elbert Street, the concurrency turns to the right and meets the northern terminus of SR 49 (East Hancock Street) and the former northern terminus of SR 112 (South Elbert Street). At this intersection, SR 22/SR 24 turn to the left onto East Hancock Street and leave town by crossing over the Oconee River. The two highways diverge with SR 22 heading to the northeast and entering Hancock County. In Sparta, it intersects SR 15/SR 16 (Broad Street). The three highways travel north-northwest and leave town. Almost immediately, they curve to the north-northeast and split, with SR 15/SR 22 continuing straight ahead. After a curve back to the north-northwest, SR 22 splits to the northeast and travels through Powelton. Then, the highway enters Taliaferro County. After an interchange with I-20 (Carl Sanders Highway), it enters Crawfordville, where it intersects US 278/SR 12 (Broad Street). It parallels the southwestern edge of A. H. Stephens Historic Park and leaves town. It crosses over the South Fork Little River and North Fork Little River before intersecting SR 44. Then, it very gradually curves to the northwest and enters Oglethorpe County. It intersects US 78/SR 10 southeast of Lexington. The concurrency crosses the southeasternmost corner of the city limits on Main Street. Just over  later, SR 77 (Elberton Road) joins the concurrency and leaves on Union Point Road. On the northwesternmost corner of the city limits, SR 22 splits off to the northeast on Comer Road. The highway crosses over the South Fork Broad River into Madison County. Almost immediately, SR 22 enters the southern city limits of Comer. At Comer Bypass, it meets its eastern terminus, an intersection with SR 72 and southern terminus of SR 98.

National Highway System
The following portions of SR 22 are part of the National Highway System, a system of routes determined to be the most important for the nation's economy, mobility, and defense:
 From its western terminus to its intersection with SR 96 in Geneva (completely concurrent with US 80 and SR 540)
 From its interchange with I-475 in western Macon to its intersection with US 41 Bus./US 129/SR 11/SR 49 in southeastern Macon (completely concurrent with US 80)
 From the eastern end of its concurrency with US 80 to the point where the concurrency with US 129/SR 11/SR 49 meet the northern city limits
 From Gray to the eastern end of the SR 24 concurrency east of Milledgeville
 The entire length of the SR 15 concurrency from Sparta to a point north of the city
 The entire length of the US 78/SR 10 concurrency from a point southeast of the city to the northwestern part of the city.

History

1920s to 1940s
SR 22 was established at least as early as 1919 from SR 1 in Columbus to Macon. At this time, SR 11 was established from Macon to SR 20 in Gray, and SR 20 was established from SR 11 in Gray to Sparta. By the end of September 1921, SR 22 was extended along the path of SR 11 from Macon to Gray. SR 20's path from Gray to Sparta was redesignated as an eastern extension of SR 22. By October 1926, US 80 was designated on the Columbus–Macon segment, and US 129 was designated on Macon–Gray segment. By October 1929, US 19 was designated on the portion of US 80/SR 22 southwest of Salem. In early 1935, SR 22 was extended north-northeast to Crawfordville. The 1938 GDOT map, the first one with inset maps, showed that US 80 entered Georgia on the 14th Street Bridge. US 80 and SR 22 traveled east on 14th Street, turned right onto US 27/SR 1/SR 85/SR 103 (1st Avenue) and traveled to the south, turned left onto 11th Street and traveled to the east, curved to the northeast on Wynnton Road, and then left Columbus. US 80 and SR 22 were indicated to have entered Macon on Montpelier Avenue, turned left on College Street and traveled to the northeast, turned right onto Georgia Avenue and traveled to the east-southeast, and turned left onto US 129/SR 11, before leaving the city. Later in 1938, SR 22 was extended north-northwest to the northern part of Taliaferro County. In the third quarter of 1939, it was extended again, to the northwest to end at US 78/SR 10 in the southeastern part of Lexington. At the end of 1940, SR 22 was extended northward to Comer. Between the beginning of 1945 and November 1946, US 80/SR 22 were then shown to travel east on 14th Street in Columbus to US 27/SR 1/SR 103 (4th Avenue), turned right onto 4th Avenue and traveled to the south, turned left onto 11th Street and traveled to the east, turned right onto 8th Avenue and traveled south for one block, turned left, and resumed its former path.

1950s to 1980s
Between April 1949 and August 1950, the path of US 80/SR 22 in Columbus was changed. They traveled east on 14th Street to US 27/SR 1/SR 103 (4th Avenue), turned right onto 4th Avenue and traveled to the south, turned left onto 13th Street and traveled to the east, turned right onto 13th Avenue and traveled to the south, and curved to the southeast, before resuming the former path. At this time, US 23 was designated on part of SR 22 in Macon. By the beginning of 1952, US 80/SR 22 were then shown to travel east on 14th Street in Columbus to US 27/SR 1/SR 103 (4th Avenue), turned right onto 4th Avenue and traveled to the south, turned left onto 11th Street and traveled to the east, turned right onto 6th Avenue and traveled to the south for one block, turned left onto 10th Street and traveled to the east, turned right onto 10th Avenue and traveled to the south for one block, and turned left onto Wynnton Road to resume former path. Between June 1955 and July 1957, US 80/SR 22 were then shown to travel east on 14th Street to US 27/SR 1/SR 85/SR 103 (4th Avenue), turned right onto 4th Avenue and traveled to the south, turned left onto 13th Street and traveled to the east, turned right onto 13th Avenue and traveled to the south, and curved to the southeast, before resuming the former path. By June 1960, the entire length of SR 22 was paved. Between June 1963 and the beginning of 1966, the path of US 80 from the central part of Columbus to northeast of the city was shifted northward, off of SR 22 and onto US 27/SR 1/SR 85/SR 103 and then US 27 Alt./SR 85. In 1967, the path of US 80 from the Alabama state line to 4th Avenue was shifted southward, off of SR 22 and onto US 280/SR 1 Spur and US 27/SR 1. The path of SR 22 in the Macon area was split in two, from east-southeast of Lizella to the southern part of Macon. SR 22 was projected and under construction on a southern path from US 80 to SR 49. SR 22 Conn. followed the former path on US 80 from the western point to just east of the I-475 interchange, with SR 74 following the former path, also on US 80, to downtown. SR 22 resumed its path on SR 49 and then US 41 Bus./SR 11. The next year, this new path of SR 22 was completed from US 80 to US 41/SR 247 (Pio Nono Avenue). It was still projected from there to SR 49. In 1971, SR 22 in the Macon area was completed to SR 49. US 80 was shifted onto the entire length of the newer path of SR 22. In 1983, SR 22's western terminus was truncated to the US 27 Alt./US 80/SR 1/SR 85 interchange. SR 22 was proposed on a farther northern path (its current path) from the Alabama state line to this interchange. The former path from 4th Avenue to the northeast was redesignated as a southwestern extension of SR 22 Spur. The former path from the Alabama state line to 4th Avenue was redesignated as part of SR 85/SR 219. At this time, a western bypass of Crawfordville, designated as SR 741, was proposed from SR 22 southwest of the city to SR 22 northwest of it. In 1985, the path of SR 22 in Columbus was completed from SR 22 Spur to I-185. The path of SR 22 in Crawfordville was shifted westward, replacing the proposed path of SR 741. In 1987, the path of SR 22 in Columbus was completed from I-185 to a point east of the US 27/SR 1 interchange.

Future

The section from the Alabama state line to Geneva is planned to be included as part of the Fall Line Freeway and could be included in the proposed I-14.

Major intersections

Special routes

Columbus connector route

State Route 22 Connector (SR 22 Conn.) is a  connector route of SR 22 that exists entirely within the city limits of Columbus in the west central part of Muscogee County. It is known as 2nd Avenue for its entire length.

It begins at an intersection with SR 85. It travels due north, curves to the north-northeast, and meets its northern terminus, an interchange with US 80/SR 22/SR 540 (J.R. Allen Parkway/Fall Line Freeway).

All of SR 22 Conn. is included as part of the National Highway System, a system of roadways important to the nation's economy, defense, and mobility.

In 1983, SR 22 Conn. was proposed from SR 85 north-northwest to what is now the path of US 80/SR 22. In 1985, SR 22 Conn. was completed on its proposed path.

Columbus spur route

State Route 22 Spur (SR 22 Spur) is a  spur route of SR 22 that exists entirely within the city limits of Columbus in the west-central and north-central parts of Muscogee County.

It begins at an intersection with US 27/SR 1 (Veterans Parkway). It travels due east on 13th Street. It turns right onto 13th Avenue and curves to the northeast onto Wynnton Road. Then, it takes on the name Macon Road and has an interchange with Interstate 185 (I-185; Lindsay Creek Bypass). Farther to the northeast, it skirts along the southern edge of Parkhill Cemetery. Just after traveling northwest of Fort Benning, it meets its eastern terminus, an intersection with US 80/SR 22/SR 540 (Beaver Run Road/Fall Line Freeway).

All of SR 22 Spur is included as part of the National Highway System, a system of roadways important to the nation's economy, defense, and mobility.

Between June 1963 and the beginning of 1966, it was established on US 80 from the northern terminus of SR 357 to SR 22 northeast of Columbus. In 1983, the western terminus of the SR 22 mainline was truncated to the US 27 Alt./US 80/SR 1/SR 85 interchange northeast of downtown. The former path of SR 22 from US 27/SR 1 in downtown to US 80 was redesignated as a southwestern extension of SR 22 Spur.

Salem spur route

State Route 22 Spur (SR 22 Spur) was a short spur route of SR 22 that partially existed in Salem, in the southern part of Upson County. Between June 1960 and June 1963, it was established from US 19/SR 3 southwest of Salem east-northeast over Auchumpkee Creek to US 80/SR 22 in the community. In 1999, this spur route was decommissioned.

Macon connector route

State Route 22 Connector (SR 22 Conn.) was a connector route of SR 22 that existed partially in Macon. In 1967, the path of SR 22 in the Macon area was split in two, from east-southeast of Lizella to the southern part of Macon. The mainline route was projected and under construction on a more southern path from US 80 to SR 49. SR 22 Conn. followed the former path on US 80 from the western terminus to just east of the Interstate 475 (I-475) interchange. In 1971, US 80 was shifted off of SR 22 Conn. and onto SR 22. In 1981, SR 22 Conn. was decommissioned.

Milledgeville connector route

State Route 22 Connector (SR 22 Conn.) was a connector route of SR 22 that existed entirely within the city limits of Milledgeville. In 1972, it and SR 24 Conn. was established on Franklin Street and Elbert Street from US 441/SR 29 to SR 22/SR 24/SR 49. Between the beginning of 1986 and the beginning of 1996, US 441/SR 29 were shifted west of the city. The former path was redesignated as US 441 Bus./SR 243. At this time, both SR 22 Conn. and SR 24 Conn. were decommissioned.

See also

References

External links

 
 Georgia Roads (Routes 21 - 40)
 Georgia State Route 22 on State-Ends.com

022
Transportation in Muscogee County, Georgia
Transportation in Talbot County, Georgia
Transportation in Taylor County, Georgia
Transportation in Upson County, Georgia
Transportation in Crawford County, Georgia
Transportation in Bibb County, Georgia
Transportation in Jones County, Georgia
Transportation in Baldwin County, Georgia
Transportation in Hancock County, Georgia
Transportation in Taliaferro County, Georgia
Transportation in Oglethorpe County, Georgia
Transportation in Madison County, Georgia
Transportation in Columbus, Georgia
Transportation in Macon, Georgia
Macon metropolitan area, Georgia
Milledgeville micropolitan area, Georgia